The Walking is the fourth studio album by Jane Siberry. The album was released on Reprise Records internationally, but remained on the independent label Duke Street Records in Canada.

Critical reception 

The album was initially poorly received by critics. It largely turned its back on the quirky new wave pop that Siberry had been known for; in its place was a surreal amalgam of progressive rock and Laurie Anderson-style performance art narratives, only one of which was shorter than six minutes.

Toronto progressive radio station CFNY, an early champion of Siberry's music, announced that it did not view any track on The Walking as viable for airplay on their station. Sales of the album were slow at first, although they improved when Siberry provided radio stations with a shorter edit of "Ingrid and the Footman".

With the benefit of passing time, the Allmusic review by Sean Carruthers does a little bit of belated justice to the caliber of composition and performance of this recording: "It's her most accomplished work to date, but it's bound to lose the casual listener quickly."

Track listing
All songs by Jane Siberry.
 "The White Tent the Raft" – 9:12
 "Red High Heels" – 7:19
 "Goodbye" – 4:17
 "Ingrid and the Footman" – 7:06
 "Lena is a White Table" – 6:41
 "The Walking (and Constantly)" – 6:16
 "The Lobby" – 6:19
 "The Bird in the Gravel" – 10:34

Personnel
Jane Siberry – vocals, guitars, piano, keyboards, backing vocals, bells
Al Cross – drums, percussion, tambourine, backing vocals
Anne Bourne – piano, organ, keyboards, backing vocals
John Switzer – bass, tambourine, percussion, backing vocals
Ken Myhr – acoustic guitar, electric guitar, backing vocals

Additional personnel
Rob Yale – keyboards on 1
Wendell Ferguson – electric guitar on 4
David MacVittie – backing vocals on 4
Bob Blumer – backing vocals on 4
Rebecca Jenkins – backing vocals on 4, 7
Gina Stepaniuk – backing vocals on 4
Cherie Camp – backing vocals on 4, 7
Sarah McElcheran – trumpet on 7
Steven Donald – trombone on 7

Charts
Album

References

1988 albums
Jane Siberry albums
Reprise Records albums
Duke Street Records albums